Nicolas Nabokov (Николай Дмитриевич Набоков;  – 6 April 1978) was a Russian-born composer, writer, and cultural figure. He became a U.S. citizen in 1939.

Life
Nicolas Nabokov, a first cousin of Vladimir Nabokov, and of the baron Eduard von Falz-Fein, was born to a family of landed Russian gentry in the town of Lubcza near Minsk, and was educated by private tutors. In 1918, after his family fled the Bolshevik Revolution to the Crimea, he began his musical education with Vladimir Rebikov. After living briefly in Germany he settled in Paris in 1923, where he studied at the Sorbonne.

Nabokov was married five times. His first wife was the Russian princess Nathalie Shakhovskaya (1903–1988). His last (1970–1978) was the French photographer Dominique Nabokov.

He had three sons: renowned French publisher Ivan Nabokov, Alexander Nabokov, and anthropologist Peter Nabokov. His close friends included the philosopher and fellow émigré Isaiah Berlin and composer Igor Stravinsky.

Career
After the years in Paris 1923–1932, in 1933 he moved to the U.S. as a lecturer in music for the Barnes Foundation. He taught music at Wells College in New York from 1936 to 1941, then moved to St. John's College in Maryland. In 1945, he worked for the U. S. Strategic Bombing Survey in Germany, on the suggestion of W. H. Auden, and stayed to work as a civilian cultural advisor in occupied Germany. Back in the US, he taught at the Peabody Conservatory from the fall of 1944 until the spring of 1945, then, in 1950–1951, served as music director at the American Academy in Rome.

In 1949, Nabokov attended a New York press conference of the visiting Soviet composer Dmitri Shostakovich and publicly humiliated him by showing he was not a free agent and had to represent the positions of Stalin's government, by asking him if he approved the Sovietic censorship over Stravinsky's music, to which Shostakovich had no option than replying that he did. In 1951, Nabokov became Secretary General of the newly formed Congress for Cultural Freedom (CCF), backed by the CIA, and remained in the job for more than fifteen years, organizing music and cultural festivals. With the effective dissolution of the CCF in 1967, Nabokov found a series of teaching jobs at American universities, and in 1970, became resident composer at the Aspen Institute for Humanistic Studies, where he remained until 1973. Although he was well-connected socially, very little of his music has been recorded as of November 2010.

Works, editions and recordings
 Nabokov's first major musical work was the ballet-oratorio Ode, for Serge Diaghilev's Ballets Russes, in 1928, followed by his Lyrical Symphony in 1931. The ode was on verses of Mikhail Lomonosov "Вечернее размышление о Божием величестве", ballet-oratorio Paris 1928.
 ballet , composed in 1934 for Ballet Russe de Monte-Carlo, choreography by Léonide Massine, libretto by Archibald MacLeish, premiered in Philadelphia and later in New York with a great success – his best known work in the US.
 opera Rasputin's End (libretto by Stephen Spender) in 1958.
 ballet on Don Quixote in 1966. 
 opera Love's Labour's Lost (libretto by W. H. Auden and Chester Kallman) was composed in 1971 and performed in 1973.

References

External links
Nicolas Nabokov's Collection at the Harry Ransom Center at The University of Texas at Austin
Nicolas Nabokov Papers. General Collection, Beinecke Rare Book and Manuscript Library, Yale University.

1903 births
1978 deaths
Russian male classical composers
Ballet composers
Russian ballet composers
Russian opera composers
Male opera composers
20th-century classical composers
Commanders Crosses of the Order of Merit of the Federal Republic of Germany
White Russian emigrants to France
White Russian emigrants to the United States
Wells College faculty
St. John's College (Annapolis/Santa Fe) faculty
Peabody Institute faculty
Emigrants from the Russian Empire to France
Ballets Russes composers
20th-century Russian male musicians